Shannon Estates is a neighborhood in north Dallas, Texas (USA), and is wholly contained within the Elm Thicket/North Park neighborhood. It is bounded by Inwood Road on the east, Mockingbird Lane on the south, Kenwell Street on the west, and West University Boulevard on the north. It borders Greenway Parks to the east, Elm Thicket/North Park to the north and west, and Highland Place to the south. Within reach are Inwood Village, West Lovers Lane businesses, Lemmon Avenue businesses, as well as easy access via Mockingbird Lane to the Dallas North Tollway.

Its residents reportedly formed a neighborhood association under the name of Shannon Estates Neighborhood Association (SENA).  However, the website no longer exists, so it isn't clear whether SENA still exists or not.

In the Spring of 2016, Elm Thicket/North Park, including Shannon Estates, was included in Dallas' Neighborhood Plus Plan.  Adopted in 2015, Neighborhood Plus is a citywide neighborhood revitalization plan for the City of Dallas to alleviate poverty, fight blight, attract and retain the middle class, increase homeownership and enhance rental options.

See Talk:Shannon_Estates,_Dallas#Neighborhood recognized by the City of Dallas? for discussion about whether Shannon Estates exists as a City of Dallas-recognized neighborhood separate from Elm Thicket/North Park.

References